Mladost Kakanj Stadium is a multi-use stadium in Doboj (Kakanj), Bosnia and Herzegovina. It is the home ground of Premier League of Bosnia and Herzegovina side Mladost. The stadium has capacity of 3,000 spectators.

Kakanj
Football venues in Bosnia and Herzegovina
Multi-purpose stadiums in Bosnia and Herzegovina